Alioune Ndour may refer to:

 Alioune Ndour (footballer, born 1997), Senegalese footballer who plays for FK Haugesund
 Alioune Ndour (footballer, born 2001), Senegalese footballer who plays for Belenenses SAD